Many acts of congress and executive actions relating to immigration to the United States and citizenship of the United States have been enacted in the United States. Most immigration and nationality laws are codified in Title 8 of the United States Code.

Acts of Congress

Executive actions

See also
 History of immigration to the United States
 History of laws concerning immigration and naturalization in the United States
 Illegal immigration to the United States
 Immigration policy of the United States
 Immigration to the United States
 List of United States federal legislation
 United States nationality law

References

Further reading
 Lemay, Michael and Elliott Robert Barkan (editors). U.S. Immigration and Naturalization Laws and Issues: A Documentary History. Greenwood Press, 1999. 
 Zolberg, Aristide. A Nation by Design: Immigration Policy in the Fashioning of America. Harvard University Press, 2006.

External links
 History of Legislation from the U.S. Citizenship & Immigration Services:
 Legislation from 1790 - 1900
 Legislation from 1901 - 1940
 Legislation from 1941 - 1960
 Legislation from 1961 - 1980
 Legislation from 1981 - 1996

List
Immigration
Legislation
Immigration-related lists

Lists of United States federal legislation